The given name Günther, Guenther, Gunther, Günter, Guenter or Gunter may refer to:

 Gunther, semi-legendary king of Burgundy
 Günter Bischof (born 1953), Austrian-American historian
 Gunther Cunningham (1946–2019), American football coach for the Detroit Lions of the NFL
 Günter Deckert (1940–2022), German neo-Nazi 
 Günter Grass (1927–2015), German novelist and Nobel laureate
 Günther Jauch (born 1956), German television presenter 
 Günther Kaschlun (1935–2020), West German rower
 Günther von Kluge (1882–1944), German field marshal during World War II
 Günther von Scheven (1908–1942), German sculptor
 Günter Kochan (1930–2009), German composer
 Günther Krause (born 1953), German politician and businessman
 Guenter Lewy (born 1923), American political historian
 Günther Lütjens (1889–1941), Kriegsmarine admiral
 Günter Meisner (1926–1994), German actor
 Gunther of Bohemia (955–1045), Bohemian hermit
 Gunther of Cologne (died 873), Roman Catholic archbishop of Cologne
 Günther Netzer (born 1944), German football player
 Günther Oettinger (born 1953), German politician 
 Günther Rall (1918–2009), German Luftwaffe pilot and third-ranking ace in history
 Günther Reindorff (1899–1974), Estonian-Soviet graphic designer
 Günter Rexrodt (1941–2004), German politician 
 Günther Schifter (1923–2008), Austrian radio presenter
 Gunther Schuller (1925–2015), American musician
 Günther Schumacher (born 1949), German track and road cyclist
 Günter Schulz, former guitarist of KMFDM and Excessive Force, current guitarist of Slick Idiot and live guitarist for PIG
 Günter Steinke (born 1956), German composer
 Günter Strack (1929–1999), German actor 
 Guenther Steiner (born 1965), team principal of the Haas F1 Team 
 Günther Tamaschke (1896–1959), German Nazi SS concentration camp commandant
 Günter Vetter (1936–2022), Austrian politician
 Gunther von Hagens (born 1 anatomist
 Günter Wallraff (born 1942), German writer and undercover journalist 
 Günter Wendt (1923–2010), German-American mechanical engineer
 Günter M. Ziegler (born 1963), German mathematician

Fictional characters and stage names
 General Gunther von Esling, a fictional general in Command & Conquer: Red Alert part 1
 Günther (singer) (born 1967), stage name of Swedish singer and musician Mats Söderlund
 Gunther (wrestler), professional wrestler, formerly going under WALTER, now named Gunther 
 Gunther, one of the main characters from the film Sing

See also 

 Ginter, a surname and given name

German masculine given names